The video game industry in the Czech Republic has produced numerous globally successful video games such as Operation Flashpoint: Cold War Crisis and the subsequent ArmA series, the Mafia series, Truck Simulator series, Kingdom Come: Deliverance, the Samorost series and others. There were 300–400 video game developers and around 30 video game companies focusing on video game development in 2014. In 2017 it was 1,100 developers and 47 companies. Video games are also considered by some experts to be the country's biggest cultural export. The video game industry did not enjoy a good reputation and was unsupported by the state until 2013, when the Ministry of Industry and Trade started to seek ways to kickstart the economy. By 2014, programs were planned to support the video game industry. Another problem is a lack of video game development specialization at any university.

In 2014, Czech video game site Bonusweb made a survey for the best video game developed in the Czech Republic and Slovakia. The victor of the survey is Mafia: City of Lost Heaven that received 3866 votes out of 13,143. Operation Flashpoint: Cold War Crisis was second and Vietcong third. In 2019, Games.cz made a list of the 15 best video games developed in the Czech Republic. It was also topped by Mafia: City of Lost Heaven.

History 

The first games were developed in Czechoslovakia during the late 1970s as part of experimentation with Czechoslovak computers SM 52/11 (minicomputer version of PDP-11). These titles lacked graphics and were not meant for wider distribution. Card games were particularly popular. Card games were played through printer due to lack of displays. There were also games based on chances such as electronical version of Rock–paper–scissors. Some games were competitive such as Dělostřelba (Cannonade) in which player had to count the trajectory of his cannon shot to hit his rival. Some games were developed on universities. Some universities taught programming at the time. Games at universities included Chess and Plivátko. The first real-time game was Přistání na měsíci (Landing on the Moon). One of the first games for character displays was Zombíci (Zombies). Players had to run for zombies and stay alive as long as possible.

In the 1980s, the first graphic video games development in the country were mostly part of the Svazarm clubs. The most popular video game platform of the time were ZX Spectrum, Czechoslovak computer PMD 85 and Atari 8-bit computers (mainly Atari 800XE). Hobbyists could come explore computing and teach themselves programming. Games developed by members of these clubs include Hlípa and Flappy. Text adventures were very popular, accounting for more than half of the total output of Czechoslovak programmers. Czechs produced games for these platforms even in 1990s when were outdated. After 1989, the market changed, improving opportunities for programmers and gamers alike.

In the 90's, the most known Czech video games are of the adventure type. During this period, the company Vochozka Trading was established, which first distributed games for Amiga computers, such as Světák Bob. The game was not successful; however, in 1994 Vochozka Trading released the first Czech commercial games for PC, two adventure titles – Tajemství Oslího ostrova (Donkey Island) and 7 dní a 7 nocí (Seven Days and Seven Nights). Both were developed by Pterodon and widely regarded as successes. This was followed by adventures like Dračí Historie (Dragon History, the first Czech dubbed game on CD, 1995), Gooka (the first Czech game on Windows, 1997), Horké léto (Hot Summer, 1997) and DreamLand: Final Solution (1999). Games released in the 1990s also include real-time strategy game Paranoia (1995) and RPG Brány Skeldalu (Gates of Skeldal, 1998). Among the most widespread Czech logical DOS games were also Vlak (Train, 1993), Achtung, die Kurve! (1995) and Boovie (1998). The game Polda was released in 1998, this was the beginning of the most popular Czech adventure series.

The first internationally successful Czech game was Hidden & Dangerous by Illusion Softworks, a third person action game released in 1999. More notable games by Illusion Softworks include Flying Heroes (2000), Mafia: The City of Lost Heaven (2002) and Vietcong (2003). In 2008 American publisher Take-Two Interactive acquired Illusion Softworks and renamed it to 2K Czech. The dark adventure Black Mirror from 2003 was a great success abroad, but two more sequels have already been made in Germany.

Bohemia Interactive became the most successful Czech developer with its worldwide bestseller Operation Flashpoint: Cold War Crisis and the series of ARMA games, first released in 2006. The success of Bohemia Interactive is regarded as having overshadowed other independent development studios.

Czech development studios such as Amanita Design along with their Machinarium from 2009, Altar Games with its Original War and UFO series and SCS Software with its Euro Truck Simulator were established in these years.

In July 2011, several people formerly of 2K Czech and Bohemia Interactive opened Warhorse Studios, which produced Kingdom Come: Deliverance (2018).

Consumer availability 
The video game market in the Czech Republic is currently growing, with a spend of 2.202 billion Czech koruna (CZK) across both the Czech Republic and Slovakia in 2011. The corresponding total for 2012 was 2.436 billion CZK, a growth of 10.6%. Purchased video games made up one third of this amount.

The most popular genres among Czech players are action and sports games. The growth of the market is expected with next-generation consoles such as the PlayStation 4 and the Xbox One.

Video game associations
Czech Games is a community of video game developers in the Czech Republic. It was established in 2001 and since then it has supported video game development beginners. It has its own phorum where developers can share its experience and show their work. The association also organizes Game Developers Session and GAMEDAY Festival.

Video Game Industry Association of the Czech Republic and the Slovak Republic exists to promote video games in the two named countries. Video game developers, publishers, importers and distributors all belong to the organization. The association also organizes the BOOOM Contest.

MU Game Studies is an association composed of Masaryk University students and graduates. It aims to improve 
and support video game education at Czech universities.

Education
Some Czech universities offer programs of study related to video games. These universities are Masaryk University in Brno, Charles University in Prague, University of West Bohemia in Pilsen, Czech Technical University in Prague and Academy of Performing Arts in Prague.

Video game companies from the Czech Republic

Defunct video game companies

Appearance of the Czech Republic in video games

The country has been featured in numerous games written by Czech developers, such as Euro Truck Simulator, Euro Truck Simulator 2 and Kingdom Come: Deliverance.

Command & Conquer takes place in Central Europe and some missions occur within the country's borders. The country was also the inspiration for fictional countries featured in Operation Flashpoint: Resistance and ARMA 2.

In Call of Duty: Modern Warfare 3, a fictionalised uprising occurs in Prague. The city also features in a mission from Sly 2: Band of Thieves.

In Forza Motorsport 5, one of the tracks available to play was based in Prague.

In Metal Gear 2: Solid Snake, the title character is sent to save kidnapped Czech scientist Dr. Kio Marv. One part of Metal Gear Solid 4: Guns of the Patriots, occurred in Prague-inspired city with Czech signs and Vltava-inspired Volta River.
One character, Smoke (real name Tomas Vrbada), in Mortal Kombat is also Czech originating from Prague.

In Deus Ex: Mankind Divided, a huge part of the story takes place in cyberpunk Prague, where the mix of modern architecture and historical building is very apparent from each other.

As part of Czechoslovakia
There are some missions in Contract J.A.C.K. that are set in Czechoslovakia. The former state also appears in the game Hidden & Dangerous.

World of Tanks released Pilsen map in December 2015. This update also features Czechoslovak Tanks.

Video game events in the Czech Republic
Game Developers Session is a game development conference that has been held annually since 2003. Video Game Culture figures including Developers have Presentation there about Video Gaming and players can meet Video Game developers for Chat about their project. They can also sometimes try video games that are in development.

Game Access is a game development conference that has been first held in Brno in 2010. Since 2016, Game Access is held annually. It includes speeches of developers from all around the world, Indie Expo where all its participants compete for Game Access Awards, Business Expo and networking events. Since 2017, the organizers included workshops in the Game Access conference.

GameFFest is a Game Festival held in Prague. Video Game Players can try Video Games for various Platforms and look around a Video Game history Museum. The Festival is a Part of PragoFFest.

The GAMEDAY Festival has been held every May in Třeboň since 2010, part of Anifilm Třeboň. .

The Czech Game of the Year Awards are annual awards that recognize accomplishments in video game development.Awards were part of Gameday Festival until became independent in 2017.

The Booom Contest was held annually from 2011 to 2013. Prizes were awarded in various categories, including Game of the Year, Best Czech Video Game and Computer Game of the Year. It was replaced by Player's Awards for next years.

The Central and Eastern European Game Studies conference is held in Brno as an event designed to allow the discussion of video gaming by academics, journalists, developers and members of the public. It is organized by the Game Studies civic association.

Game Jam Prague is annually held in January as part of almost 200 Game Jams over the World.

Game Brew Plzeň is a meeting of video game developers, graphic designers and business enthusiasts. It has been held in Plzeň since 2015.

Gamer Pie is a video game festival held in Brno.

Media

Print Media

Defunct print media

Czech TV programs about video games

Programs

Programs no longer broadcast

Online media 
BOOOM.cz
Bonusweb.cz/
Doupě.cz
Eurogamer.cz
GamePark.cz/
Games.cz
PLAYzone
Hrej.cz
Zing.cz
Databáze-her.cz

Notable people in the Czech gaming industry 
Petr Vochozka — founder and a former CEO of Illusion Softworks (now 2K Czech), the company responsible for games like Hidden & Dangerous or Mafia: The City of Lost Heaven.
Marek Španěl and Ondřej Španěl — founders of Bohemia Interactive, the biggest video game development company in the Czech Republic. The company developed Operation Flashpoint: Cold War Crisis, ARMA series and DayZ.
Daniel Vávra — author of Mafia: The City of Lost Heaven. He also founded Warhorse Studios, which developed Kingdom Come: Deliverance.
Jakub Dvorský — CEO of the independent video game company Amanita Design, developers of Samorost and Machinarium.
Miloš Endrle — CTO and founder of Geewa, a company awarded the Red Herring 100 Europe award.
Lukáš Macura — founder and CEO of Cinemax. He is also responsible for Database of Czech and Slovak Video games.
František Fuka — programmer and musician who made video games for the ZX Spectrum during the 1980s and 1990s. Currently working as a film translator, preparing English language movies for Czech release.
Lukáš Ladra — founder and first editor-in-chief of Excalibur, the original Czech video gaming magazine.
Marek Rosa — founder and CEO of Keen Software House, developers Space Engineers.

References

External links 
A database of video games developed in the Czech Republic